Mr. Fixit is a Canadian instructional television series which aired on CBC Television from 1955 to 1965.

Premise
The series demonstrated home repairs and construction by Peter Whittall, previously seen on Living. Whittall, nicknamed Mr. Fixit, was joined by host Rex Loring. Due to its 15-minute time slot, Mr. Fixit concentrated on basic repair and construction techniques.

Scheduling
The first five seasons of this 15-minute series were broadcast on Saturdays at 6:30 p.m. (Eastern) from the debut on 8 October 1955. As of 2 July 1960, the series was moved to a Wednesday 7:45 p.m. time slot where it remained until its last broadcast on 30 June 1965.
One of its earlier directors was Patrick Watson.

Reception
By 1962, the series attracted approximately 33,000 viewer letters annually according to CBC estimates.

References

External links
 
 

CBC Television original programming
1955 Canadian television series debuts
1965 Canadian television series endings
Black-and-white Canadian television shows